Gainesville G-Men were a professional minor league baseball team, based in Gainesville, Florida, that played in the then Class D Florida State League. The team won league championships in 1937, 1938 and 1947.

The club folded on June 1, 1952, due to funding issues.

References

List of Gainesville G-Men seasons and stats

Baseball teams established in 1936
Defunct minor league baseball teams
Defunct Florida State League teams
Sports in Gainesville, Florida
Defunct baseball teams in Florida
St. Louis Cardinals minor league affiliates
Washington Senators minor league affiliates
Cleveland Guardians minor league affiliates
1936 establishments in Florida
1958 disestablishments in Florida
Sports clubs disestablished in 1958
Baseball teams disestablished in 1958